The Novosibirsk bus system is part of the public transport network of Novosibirsk, Russia. The system was launched in 1923.

History
The first route was launched in the summer of 1923: the buses ran between the railway station, city center and Zakamenka district (the area where now the State Public Scientific & Technological Library is located).

In 1937, Novosibirsk bus system comprised 30 buses and 4 routes.

In 1985 the bus fleet had more than 1600 buses.

Since the 1990s, alongside the municipal operator, a private carriers serve bus routes in Novosibirsk.

Current status

System consists of 52 routes served by buses over 10 metres long (№№ 3, 4, 5, 6, 7, 8, 11, 13, 14, 16, 18, 18к, 20, 21, 23, 28, 29, 30, 31, 32, 34, 35, 36, 37, 39, 41, 42, 44, 45, 46, 50, 51, 53, 54, 55, 57, 59, 60, 61, 64, 65, 68, 69, 73, 77, 79, 88, 91, 95, 96, 97, 98) and 17 routes served by smaller buses (№№ 1, 9, 10, 15, 19, 24, 27, 40, 43, 48, 49, 52, 52к, 58, 67, 72, 74).

The bus fleet is represented by such models as Russian PAZ-3205, LiAZ-5256, LiAZ-5293, and NefAZ-5299, Belarusian MAZ-103, MAZ-104, MAZ-206, and MAZ-226 with an internal combustion engines. Local authorities planned that at least 50% of buses will be natural gas vehicles by 2020. In 2012, special battery electric bus based on NefAZ-5299 was tested.

Gallery

References

External links
 The register of the routes of Novosibirsk city public transport (in Russian)

Transport in Novosibirsk
1923 establishments in the Soviet Union
Bus transport in Russia